The Jones Rocks are coastal outcrops  southwest of the Avalanche Rocks, on the east shore of the Bay of Winds. They were discovered by the Australasian Antarctic Expedition, 1911–14, under Mawson, and named by him for Dr. Sydney Evan Jones, medical officer with the expedition.

References

Rock formations of Queen Mary Land